Best of the Best is a 1992 Hong Kong action film directed by Herman Yau and starring Jacky Cheung, Ng Man-tat and Sammi Cheng in her debut film role.

Plot
Little Ball (Ng Man-tat) is a retired police officer who works as a beverage server in a bar. However, he has not changed his bad habits of being loud-mouth and compulsive drinking and gambling. Fortunately, he is helped and taken care by his confidant, Hung (Carrie Ng). One time, Ball unintentionally got his son, Dee (Jacky Cheung), a Special Duties Unit officer, into a dispute with triad leader, Ngan Kwan (Paul Chun), nearly destroying his son's career.

At the same time, Dee also meets Heidi (Sammi Cheng) during a police operation and a romantic relationship ensued between them. However, things do not go well for long when Heidi is discovered to be Ngan's daughter. Ngan forces Dee to resign from his job, but Dee has a strong sense of righteousness and firmly rejects Ngan and proceeds to go on vacation with Heidi on Lantau Island. Seeing how Dee disregards him and also thinking that he is eloping with his daughter, Ngan orders his underlings to find and kill Dee. When Ball hears of this, he goes to plead Ngan, but he gets beaten instead. Later, a group of killers surround Dee in the streets and when he fell into danger, the wounded Ball appears and sacrifices his life to rescue his son. At this time, Dee realises his father's love for him and vows to seek vengeance on Ngan.

Cast
Jacky Cheung as Lee Man-kit / Dee
William Chu as young Lee Man-kit
Ng Man-tat as Little Ball
Sammi Cheng as Heidi
Paul Chun as Ngan Kwan
Carrie Ng as Hung
John Ching as Tsuen
Leung Sap-yat as Hong
Richard Cheung as Brother Keung
Victor Hon as Brother Nine Teeth
Lee Siu-kei as SDU instructor
To Siu-chuen as KK
Mai Kei as Scalper
Jack Wong as Robber at mall
Tang Tai-wo as Robber at mall
Wan Seung-lam as Robber at mall
Joe Chu as Robber at mall
Lee Yiu-king as Hitman
Ho Wing-cheung as Kwan's thug
Choi Hin-cheung as Kwan's thug
Leung Kei-hei as Brother Hung
Leung Sam as Temple sticks interpreter
Simon Cheung as Policeman
Fung Man-kwong as Kwan's thug
Kent Chow as Kwan's thug
Chung Wing as Kwan's thug
Ling Chi-hung as Kwan's thug
Wong King-wai as Kwan's thug
Alex Yip as Kwan's thug
Lam Chi-tai as Kwan's thug

Reception

Critical
Love HK Film gave the film a mixed review noting its plot as nothing new with "no great shakes" but also praising its acting as "better-than-average"

Box office
The film grossed HK$6,422,069 at the Hong Kong box office during its theatrical run from 29 May to 10 June 1992 in Hong Kong.

See also
Jacky Cheung filmography

References

External links

Best of the Best at Hong Kong Cinemagic

1992 films
1992 action films
1990s romantic action films
Hong Kong romantic action films
Police detective films
Gun fu films
Triad films
1990s Cantonese-language films
Films directed by Herman Yau
Films set in Hong Kong
Films shot in Hong Kong
1990s Hong Kong films